Still Life with Cake is an early 19th century still life painting by Raphaelle Peale. Done in oil on canvas, the painting is in the collection of the Metropolitan Museum of Art.

The work is on view in the Metropolitan Museum's Gallery 756.

Description 
The painting has some similarities with Spanish still life paintings, which Peale may have been inspired by when he visited Mexico. Still Life with Cake as "Still Life—Wine, Cakes, Grapes, &c."

References 

1818 paintings
Paintings in the collection of the Metropolitan Museum of Art
Still life paintings